The England national cricket team toured the West Indies from February to April 1986 and played a five-match Test series against the West Indies cricket team which the West Indies won 5–0. England were captained by David Gower; the West Indies by Viv Richards. In addition, the teams played a four-match One Day International (ODI) series which the West Indies won 3–1.

Background
England had just beaten Australia 3–1 in the 1985 Ashes. As with the 1980–81 tour, Guyana’s government rigidly refused to admit cricketers who had ever played in apartheid South Africa, so England did not visit there. Antigua Sports Minister Lester Bird wished leading rebel player Graham Gooch to apologise and to promise he would never return to South Africa until apartheid was dismantled. To compensate two Tests were scheduled for Queen’s Park Oval in Trinidad, but for a time it was feared that the government there would follow Guyana and Bird and exclude or demand apologies from those linked to South Africa.

Tour
The tour began poorly for England, losing by seven wickets to the Windward Islands despite a 77 from Mike Gatting and five wickets from Phil Edmonds. They almost lost their next game, against the Leeward Islands. After batting well in the first innings (Gatting, Gooch, Robinson and Lamb all scoring half centuries) England collapsed in the second and were lucky to escape with a draw.

Things improved when they beat Jamaica, chiefly due to the batting of Gatting and Lamb and the bowling of Edmonds.

Gatting had been England's in-form batsman, but in the first one-day game his nose was broken. England collapsed and the West Indies won easily.

Gatting was unable to play in the first test, which the West Indies won easily. Richard Ellison took a five wicket haul and Peter Willey scored a second innings 71, forcing the West Indies to bat again, but England were unable to resist the West Indies fast bowlers, especially debutant Patrick Patterson, and the game was over inside three days.

England's next game, against Trinidad and Tobago, was a draw.

They bounced back to win their next game, a one-day international against the West Indies due to a century from Graham Gooch.

For the Second Test England decided to go with four specialist batsmen and lost the game. England's star players (especially Ian Botham) continued to struggle, while Richie Richardson made a century and Malcolm Marshall took eight wickets. Assisted by John Emburey's bowling and a last wicket stand from Richard Ellison and Greg Thomas, England managed to take the match into a fifth day and take three of the mere five second-innings West Indies wickets they would take all series, but these were meagre achievements.

The tour went downhill even further when they lost to Barbados by three wickets.

The West Indies easily won the next one day international. They won the 3rd test by an innings and 30 runs. Then they won the 4th ODI by eight wickets.

The West Indies won the 4th test by ten wickets. They won the 5th handsomely as well, Viv Richards scoring a century in 56 balls, which was at the time the fastest in terms of balls faced in Test match history.

Touring party

Test series

1st Test

2nd Test

3rd Test

4th Test

5th Test

One Day Internationals (ODIs)

West Indies won the series 3—1.

1st ODI

2nd ODI

3rd ODI

4th ODI

References

Further reading 
  (by the wife of spin-bowler Phil Edmonds)

1986 in English cricket
1986 in West Indian cricket
1985-86
International cricket competitions from 1985–86 to 1988
West Indian cricket seasons from 1970–71 to 1999–2000